XHZB-FM is a radio station on 101.7 FM in Oaxaca, Oaxaca, Mexico. XHZB carries the La Mejor grupera format from MVS Radio.

History
XHZB began as XEZB-AM 1120, owned by Manuel Zarate Aquino. It received its concession on July 15, 1971 and broadcast on 1120 kHz as a daytimer. Ownership passed to Alberto Miguel Márquez Rodríguez, director of ORO, in 1986.

References

Radio stations in Oaxaca City
Radio stations established in 1971